Sarkis Garabet Soghanalian (February 6, 1929 – October 5, 2011), nicknamed Merchant of Death, was a Syrian- Lebanese-Armenian international private arms dealer who gained fame for being the "Cold War's largest arms merchant" and the lead seller of firearms and weaponry to the former government of Iraq under Saddam Hussein during the 1980s.

Soghanalian, then a permanent resident living in Virginia Gardens, Florida, was hired on behalf of the Central Intelligence Agency to sell arms to help Iraq in the midst of the Iran–Iraq War. With the encouragement of the Reagan Administration and the backing of American intelligence agencies, he oversaw the transaction of several significant arms deals, including the sale of French-built artillery valued at $1.4 billion. Besides Iraq, he also sold weapons to groups such as the Polisario forces in Mauritania, the Phalange militia during the Lebanese Civil War, to Latin American countries such as Nicaragua, Ecuador, and to Argentina during the Falklands War. He extended his services to other regions of the world, including Africa. Prior to the beginning of the Persian Gulf War, Soghanalian appeared in several television interviews, explaining in detail the work he had done in Iraq, along with naming several top American government officials who were involved in the arms transactions.

With this, the Justice Department charged Soghanalian for "conspiracy of shipping unauthorized weapons" to Iraq where he was found guilty and sentenced to jail. He was released several years later when he helped the Clinton administration unsuccessfully break up a counterfeiting ring in Lebanon. He moved his office from the United States and opened up operations in France and Jordan. In 2001, he was arrested once more by the US government on bank fraud charges but was released a year later after he revealed the weapons transactions deals were taking place between the CIA and Peru (which arguably resulted in the collapse of the Alberto Fujimori government).

Early life
Soghanalian was born to an Armenian family in what was then French mandate Syrian Iskanderun (now part of Turkey). In late 1939, his family moved to Lebanon. Due to the poor economic conditions his family lived in at the time, he decided to drop out of high school and joined the French Army and served in a tank division. It was from his experience in the military that brought him into the world of weaponry and, in his words, he "adapted to it from childhood and kept going".

Soghanalian later took up a job as a ski instructor in Lebanon, where he met and married his American wife.

Initial arms deals

Lebanon
Soghanalian was introduced to the world of arms trade in the beginning of the 1970s. He sold his first consignment of firearms in 1973, mainly consisting of American weaponry (the Lebanese military had largely been armed by the United States). However, he was soon able to procure weaponry from a multitude of Eastern bloc countries including Bulgaria, Hungary and Poland. The arms consisted largely of small arms and infantry weapons. After the civil war, he moved his arms operations to other countries, supplying the Christian Phalange militia in Lebanon, various factions in Ecuador, Mauritania and Nicaragua, Mobutu Sese Seko's Zaire, an American C-130 Hercules transport plane to Libya's Muammar al-Gaddafi, the Argentine military in the Falklands War, until moving on to Saddam Hussein's Iraq.

Iraq
According to Soghanalian, the United States was fully aware of his operations when he moved on to Iraq: "The Americans knew what I was doing, every minute, every hour. If I drank a glass of water, they were aware of it and what kind of water it was." He had built and maintained a largely amiable relationship with the United States ever since it had landed a contingent of Marines in Lebanon in 1958. American intelligence officials had described him as a cooperative and reliable source in Lebanon, making him an ideal candidate to conduct the arms deal with Iraq. With the beginning of the Iran–Iraq War in 1980, he began to sell weapons to Iraq with the blessing of the United States. Since there was an arms embargo placed against Iraq, the weapons were funneled through various countries. His most significant deal came with the sale of several French 155mm self-propelled howitzers valued at an estimated $1.4 billion.

Iraqi leaders had initially approached the Reagan administration to purchase American 175mm artillery, but were turned down. They were, however, encouraged by American officials to procure the weapons through private arms dealers. The Iraqis in 1981 appealed to Soghanalian, then based in Miami, Florida, who in turn approached several European governments. He found French leader François Mitterrand well-disposed to conducting the transaction so long as the deal was kept secret, since Iran was holding French hostages at the time, and  France did not wish to antagonize it further. The U.S. encouraged Mitterrand to approve the sale, known as "Vulcan", as it passed through a complex set of transactions.

Soghanalian defended the sales when they were revealed on the eve of the Gulf War in January 1991. He stated that, "We didn't give him those weapons to fight U.S. forces. The weapons were given to him to fight the common enemy [Iran] at that time. Which he did. There was no need to have direct confrontation with him and endanger American troops." His other transactions to Iraq also included artillery from South Africa, which he routed through Austria as a "middle man," to bypass United Nations sanctions. Soghanalian helped sell to the Iraqi army military uniforms worth $280,000,000 from Romania.

In an interview with 60 Minutes, Soghanalian stated that top-level American officials were aware from the beginning of his deals in Iraq. These included former U.S. President Richard Nixon, former Vice-President Spiro Agnew, Nixon's chief of staff Colonel Jack Brennan and attorney general John N. Mitchell. Encouraged by other senior officials, Nixon had written a letter on his behalf to expedite the sale of the uniforms to Iraq. Soghanalian remarked that "They were not only in the uniform business. They would sell their mothers if they could, just to make the money." He also predicted that the ensuing war between Coalition troops and Iraq would turn into a lengthy and costly conflict, much like the Iran–Iraq War. This assertion ultimately proved incorrect as Coalition troops rapidly ejected the Iraqi army from Kuwait in February 1991.

Arrest and conviction
Soghanalian's testimony exposed the role of American government officials in the illicit arms trade. Members of Congress noted that his revelations had been found to be "extremely disturbing to every American. They are disturbing to Mr. Soghanalian. He gives a first-hand description of official and unofficial American involvement in the enormous buildup of arms to Saddam Hussein."

His testimony led to the George H. W. Bush administration open criminal charges against him in 1991. He was convicted on six counts for possession of armament and intent to sell to Iraq. The weapons included 103 helicopter gunships from the Hughes Helicopters corporation and two rocket-propelled grenade launchers from a 1983 deal. A year later, he was fined $20,000 and sentenced to six years in prison. However, in 1993 his sentence was reduced to two years. Although the exact reasons remain unknown, his attorney stated that Soghanalian had given intelligence to U.S. law-enforcement officials that led them to an unsuccessful attempt to break up a $100 billion counterfeiting operation in the Bekaa valley in Lebanon. In 1995, after he was released, he moved to France and opened offices there and in Amman, Jordan.

Peru
In 1999 Soghanalian arranged for an air drop of 10,000 AK-47 assault rifles, originally from East Germany and Jordan, intended for use by the Peruvian government but most of it fell into the possession of the Colombian leftist guerrilla organization FARC, which were opposed to the US-backed government of Colombia. Soghanalian had been able to purchase the rifles for $55 apiece in addition to a $20 transportation, and "shipping and handling" fee. Several months later, it was revealed that the CIA had backed the deal to arm Peruvian intelligence head Vladimiro Montesinos.

Philanthropy
Though known for his role in the global arms trade, Soghanalian also used his resources to dispatch 26 planes to deliver humanitarian relief to the Soviet Union in the wake of the devastating earthquake that hit Spitak, Armenia in 1988. For his efforts, President George H. W. Bush described him as an individual who "strengthened the ties that unite mankind," while Mother Teresa wrote him a letter, stating that God would reward him and his family's efforts a "hundredfold."

In popular culture
The character Simeon Weisz from the 2005 film Lord of War is a fictional  character created as a composite of real life, middle-eastern arms dealers, including Soghanalian.

Death
Soghanalian died on October 5, 2011 at the Hialeah Hospital in Hialeah, Florida.

See also
 Viktor Bout

References

External links
 Merchants of Death 1999 documentary that travels into the lives of the two biggest private arms dealers in the world—Sarkis Soghanalian and Samuel Cummings
 "CIA FOIA Report detailing possible arms drop from Miami, Florida"

1929 births
2011 deaths
Lebanese people of Armenian descent
Armenian businesspeople
Lebanese businesspeople
20th-century criminals
Armenian criminals
Lebanese criminals
People convicted of arms trafficking
Syrian emigrants to the United States
Syrian people of Armenian descent